The 1966 Gillette Cup was the fourth Gillette Cup, an English limited overs county cricket tournament. It was held between 28 April and 3 September 1966. The tournament was won by Warwickshire County Cricket Club in the final at Lord's.

Format
The seventeen first-class counties, were joined by five Minor Counties: Berkshire, Cheshire, Hertfordshire, Lincolnshire and Suffolk. Teams who won in the first round progressed to the second round. The winners in the second round then progressed to the quarter-final stage. Winners from the quarter-finals then progressed to the semi-finals from which the winners then went on to the final at Lord's which was held on 3 September 1966.

First round

Second round

Quarter-finals

Semi-finals

Final

References

External links
CricketArchive tournament page 

Friends Provident Trophy seasons
Gillette Cup, 1966